Poaephyllum is a genus of flowering plants from the orchid family, Orchidaceae native to Southeast Asia and New Guinea.

Poaephyllum fimbriatum Schuit. & de Vogel - Papua New Guinea
Poaephyllum grandiflorum Quisumb. - Palawan
Poaephyllum pauciflorum (Hook.f.) Ridl. - Thailand, Malaysia, Borneo, Sumatra, Java, Philippines
Poaephyllum podochiloides (Schltr.) Ridl. - Borneo, New Guinea
Poaephyllum selebicum J.J.Sm. - Sulawesi
Poaephyllum tenuipes (Schltr.) Rolfe - New Guinea
Poaephyllum trilobum J.J.Sm.  - New Guinea

See also 
 List of Orchidaceae genera

References 

 Berg Pana, H. 2005. Handbuch der Orchideen-Namen. Dictionary of Orchid Names. Dizionario dei nomi delle orchidee. Ulmer, Stuttgart

External links 

Podochileae genera
Eriinae